Conostephium laeve is a species of flowering plant in the family Ericaceae and is endemic to the west of Western Australia. It is a compact shrub with erect, narrowly elliptic or narrowly egg-shaped leaves with the narrower end toward the base, and pendulous, spindle-shaped, cream to straw-coloured and pink flowers.

Description
Both sides of the leaves are usually hairy. The flowers are more or less pendulous with overlapping bracts at the base.

Taxonomy and naming
Conostephium laeve was first formally described in 2013 by Michael Hislop in the journal Nuytsia from specimens he collected near Northampton in 2005. The specific epithet (laeve) means "smooth", referring to the petal tube.

Distribution and habitat
Conostephium laeve grows in woodland, shrubland or heath, mainly from the Shark Bay area and through Kalbarri National Park to near Binnu in the north of the Geraldton Sandplains bioregion, and in the far west of the Yalgoo bioregion, in the west of Western Australia.

Conservation status
This conostephium is listed as "not threatened" by the Western Australian Government Department of Biodiversity, Conservation and Attractions.

References

laeve
Epacridoideae
Eudicots of Western Australia
Ericales of Australia
Endemic flora of Western Australia
Plants described in 2013